Spelthorne Borough Council in Surrey, England is elected every four years. Since the last boundary changes in 2003, 39 councillors are elected from 13 wards.

Political control
Since the foundation of the council in 1973 political control of the council has been held by the following parties:

Leadership
The leaders of the council since 1995 have been:

Council elections
1973 Spelthorne Borough Council election
1976 Spelthorne Borough Council election
1979 Spelthorne Borough Council election (New ward boundaries)
1983 Spelthorne Borough Council election
1987 Spelthorne Borough Council election
1991 Spelthorne Borough Council election (Borough boundary changes took place but the number of seats remained the same)
1995 Spelthorne Borough Council election (Borough boundary changes took place but the number of seats remained the same)
1999 Spelthorne Borough Council election (Borough boundary changes took place but the number of seats remained the same)
2003 Spelthorne Borough Council election (New ward boundaries reduced the number of seats by 1)
2007 Spelthorne Borough Council election
2011 Spelthorne Borough Council election
2015 Spelthorne Borough Council election
2019 Spelthorne Borough Council election

By-election results

1995-1999

1999-2003

2007-2011

2011-2015

2015-2019

2019-2023

References

By-election results

External links
Spelthorne Borough Council

 
Borough of Spelthorne
Council elections in Surrey
District council elections in England